The 1967–68 Kansas Jayhawks men's basketball team represented the University of Kansas during the 1967–68 college men's basketball season.

Roster
Jo Jo White
Rodger Bohnenstiehl
Dave Nash
Phil Harmon
Bruce Sloan
Rich Bradshaw
Greg Douglas
Vernon Vanoy
Howard Arndt
Chester Lawrence
Rich Thomas

Schedule

References

Kansas Jayhawks men's basketball seasons
Kansas
Kansas
Kansas
Kansas